AGF Fodbold Women; commonly known as AGF, is a Danish women's football based in Aarhus, Jutland, who plays in the Danish top-division Elitedivisionen. 

The club was founded in March 2020, were the clubs VSK Aarhus, IF Lyseng and Aarhus Gymnastikforening decided to have make up a women's team, who should be playing in the best top-division in Denmark Elitedivisionen. The club took over VSK's place in the league. The club must appear under the AGF's jerseys and under the name AGF Women.

It is an established and joint-stock company 'AGF Kvindefodbold ApS', where AGF A/S owns 80% and VSK Aarhus and IF Lyseng each own 10%.

The women's league team will train and play matches at Vejlby Stadium, the men's youth team will have Lyseng Stadion as home stadium.

Team

Current squad

References

External links 
Official website in English

Women's football clubs in Denmark
Association football clubs established in 2020
Sport in Aarhus
2020 establishments in Denmark